Neostygarctus is a genus of tardigrades. It is the only genus in the family Neostygarctidae. It was named and described by Grimaldi de Zio, D'Addabbo Gallo and Morone De Lucia in 1982.

Species
The genus includes three species:
 Neostygarctus acanthophorus Grimaldi de Zio, D'Addabbo Gallo & Morone De Lucia, 1982
 Neostygarctus lovedeluxe Fujimoto & Miyazaki, 2013, named after a Stand from JoJo's Bizarre Adventure that was in turn named after an album by Sade; the discoverers said that the "hairy appearance of the new species appears as if affected by the power of 'Love Deluxe'".
 Neostygarctus oceanopolis Kristensen, Sørensen, Hansen & Zeppilli, 2015

References

Further reading
Grimaldi de Zio, D'Addabbo Gallo & Morone De Lucia (1982), Neostygarctus acanthophorus, n. gen. n. sp., nuovo tardigrado marino del Mediterraneo. [Neostygarctus acanthophorus, n. gen. n. sp., New Marine Tardigrades of the Mediterranean] Cahiers de Biologie Marine, vol. 23, no, 3, p. 319-323.

Arthrotardigrada
Tardigrade genera